Hydrillodes janalis is a species of moth of the family Erebidae described by William Schaus and W. G. Clements in 1893. It is endemic to Sierra Leone.

See also
List of moths of Sierra Leone

References

Endemic fauna of Sierra Leone
Herminiinae
Moths described in 1893
Moths of Africa
Taxa named by William Schaus